Thomas Atkinson (March 9, 1928 – June 10, 1988) was Mayor of Green Bay, Wisconsin.

Biography
Atkinson was born on March 9, 1928. He would serve in the United States Navy during World War II and attend the University of Nevada, Reno. Atkinson married Patricia Liebergen and had six children. He died from cancer on June 10, 1988.

Political career
After serving as an alderman and supervisor, Atkinson became Mayor in 1973 and held office until 1975. He also ran unsuccessfully for Mayor in 1979 and 1987.

References

1928 births
1988 deaths
Wisconsin city council members
Mayors of Green Bay, Wisconsin
Military personnel from Wisconsin
United States Navy sailors
United States Navy personnel of World War II
University of Nevada, Reno alumni
Deaths from cancer in Wisconsin
20th-century American politicians